Eupalamides is a genus of moths within the family Castniidae. It was described by Constant Vincent Houlbert in 1918.

Species
 Eupalamides boliviensis (Houlbert, 1917)
 Eupalamides cyparissias (Fabricius, 1777)
 Eupalamides geron (Kollar, 1839)
 Eupalamides guyanensis (Houlbert, 1917)
 Eupalamides preissi (Staudinger, 1899)

References

Castniidae